William "Bill" Konopnicki (April 7, 1945 – October 17, 2012) was an Arizona politician. He and his wife were also the owners of radio station KTHQ as well as several others. Konopnicki was a Republican.

Konopnicki was born in Michigan and moved with his parents to Yuma, Arizona when he was five. He studied at Arizona Western College and Arizona State University. He later received a doctors degree in education from the University of Arizona. Konopnicki worked as a school teacher before he became a businessman. He ran various radio stations and also owned several McDonald's restaurants. He was also on the faculty of Eastern Arizona College for a time.

Konopnicki is a Latter-day Saint. Among other positions in the LDS Church he served as a bishop and a stake president.

Konopnicki was a member of the Arizona State House beginning in 2002 to 2010. He opposed efforts to have Arizona engage in enforcing federal immigration laws.

Sources
 State House bio of Konopnicki
 Arizona Republic article on Konopnicki
 Obituary for Konopnicki
 Arizona Republic obit for Konopnicki

1945 births
Members of the Arizona House of Representatives
Latter Day Saints from Arizona
Arizona State University alumni
University of Arizona alumni
Eastern Arizona College faculty
2012 deaths